The 1900 Rittenhouse Square Apartments is a historic high-rise building on Rittenhouse Square in downtown Philadelphia, Pennsylvania. It was built 1923–1926.

1900 Rittenhouse Square was added to the National Register of Historic Places in 1982. It was listed on the Philadelphia Register of Historic Places on January 7, 1982, and February 8, 1995.

References

External links
Listing at emporis.com
Listing at Philadelphia Architects and Buildings

Residential buildings on the National Register of Historic Places in Philadelphia
Residential buildings completed in 1926
Rittenhouse Square, Philadelphia
Residential skyscrapers in Philadelphia